Mesovelia amoena is a species of water treader in the family Mesoveliidae. It is found in the Caribbean Sea, Central America, North America, Oceania, and South America.

References

Further reading

 

Articles created by Qbugbot
Insects described in 1894
Mesoveliidae